Santosh Kumar may refer to:

 Santosh Kumar (actor),  Pakistani film actor
 Santosh Kumar (politician), Indian politician
 Santosh Kumar (referee), Indian football referee